The 55th Artillery Brigade is an artillery formation of the Ukrainian Ground Forces, based in Zaporizhia.  It is one of the oldest artillery units in Ukraine.

In 2018 the brigade received its honorific title Zaporozhian Sich. The brigade is operating a squadron (6 batteries of 3 units each) of CAESAR self-propelled howitzers gifted by France during the 2022 Russian invasion of Ukraine.

Current structure 

As of 2017 the brigade's structure is as follows:

 55th Artillery Brigade, Zaporizhia
 Headquarters & Headquarters Battery
 1st Howitzer Artillery Battalion (2A65 Msta-B)
 2nd Howitzer Artillery Battalion (2A65 Msta-B)
 3rd Howitzer Artillery Battalion (2A65 Msta-B)
 4th Anti-tank Artillery Battalion (MT-12 Rapira)
 Artillery Reconnaissance Battalion
 39th Motorized Infantry Battalion "Dnipro-2"
 Engineer Company
 Maintenance Company
 Logistic Company
 CBRN-defense Platoon

Commanders 
  Colonel Roman Kachur March 2018 – present

Notes

References

Artillery brigades of Ukraine
Military units and formations of the 2022 Russian invasion of Ukraine